Floyd Joy Mayweather (born October 19, 1952) is an American boxing trainer and former professional boxer who competed from 1973 to 1990. Fighting at welterweight during the 1970s and 1980s, Mayweather Sr. was known for his defensive abilities and overall knowledge of boxing strategy. He is the father and former trainer of Floyd Mayweather Jr., and also father to Justin Mayweather, an American boxer residing in Las Vegas.

Boxing career
Mayweather Sr.'s boxing record was 28–6–1 (18 TKOs), and he won the U.S. Championship Tournament in 1977 against Miguel Barreto. Four months later, he was shot in the leg in a family dispute which virtually ended his career.

Trainer 
As a trainer, Mayweather preaches defense and a stiff jab. He teaches many of his boxers a defensive technique known as the shoulder roll, in which the fighter uses his front shoulder to deflect blows and limit their impact. He has on many occasions, including HBO's Mayweather-Hatton 24/7, claimed to be Floyd Mayweather Sr., 'The Greatest Dog of All Time'".

Floyd Mayweather Sr. taught Mayweather Jr. to punch when he was still a toddler in Grand Rapids, Michigan. His training was disrupted by a five-and-a-half-year prison sentence on a drug-dealing conviction, and he resumed training his son 14 fights into his professional career. He had a public falling out with his son in 2000, and his brother Roger took over training Mayweather Jr..

He is the former trainer of top light heavyweight Chad Dawson, former two-division champion Joan Guzmán and women's champion Laila Ali. He is well known for his stint as Oscar De La Hoya's trainer from 2001 through 2006. He said he would train De La Hoya for his May 5, 2007, fight against his son, but demanded a $2 million fee to do so. After considerable deliberation, De La Hoya opted not to hire Mayweather Sr. and announced on January 30, 2007, he would use Freddie Roach instead.

The snub briefly reunited father and son, with Floyd Sr. turning up at the Mayweather Jr. boxing gym, while Roger (who had been banned from being in the corner at boxing matches for 12 months for starting a riot during Floyd Jr.'s bout against Zab Judah on April 8, 2006, when he attacked Judah) served six months in jail for a domestic assault. But when Roger was released, the situation became awkward because of the brothers’ rivalry. 

Floyd Jr. chose Roger as his trainer and Floyd Sr. left again, claiming that the father-son relationship was "back to square one" for choosing Roger over his own father again. Floyd Sr. agreed to once again train De La Hoya in anticipation for Mayweather Jr. – De La Hoya II presented by Golden Boy Promotions. However, due to disagreements with how revenues would be divided amongst the two fighters, the bout was canceled. Mayweather Sr. trained Manchester's Ricky Hatton for seven weeks prior to his bout against Paulie Malignaggi on November 22, 2008, at the MGM Grand in Las Vegas.

Hatton retained his IBO light welterweight title with a technical knockout in the 11th round. However, Hatton lost only his second fight under Mayweather Sr. with a second-round knockout by Manny Pacquiao. The famous feud between Floyd Mayweather Sr. and Floyd Mayweather Jr. finally came to an end as father and son made up before Jr.'s return to the ring after a 21-month layoff. However Jr.'s uncle Roger Mayweather still trained Jr. On the HBO 24/7 program, Floyd Mayweather Sr. was quoted as saying 'I don't need to train my son, I need a relationship with my son."

A proposed March 2010 fight between Mayweather Jr. and Manny Pacquiao fell by the wayside in January 2010 when the camps representing both fighters could not agree on a timeline for drug testing for the fight. A more stringent drug test was sought by Mayweather Jr.'s representatives due to inadequacies in the current testing standards and a suspicion that Pacquiao might be utilizing banned performance enhancers in his training regimen. Mayweather Sr. had been very vocal about his theory that Manny Pacquiao's impressive displays as a welterweight were aided by performance-enhancing drugs for several months prior to the negotiation for a fight between his son and Pacquiao. On March 21, 2011, U.S. District Judge Larry Hicks said Pacquiao had sufficient evidence to continue his lawsuit that alleged Floyd Sr., Floyd Jr., and Roger acted with malice by accusing the Filipino boxer, and as of December 2011 Floyd Jr. had been deposed and the case was continuing seeking damages of $10 million.

Mayweather trained UFC fighter BJ Penn for two weeks.

In May 2013, for the first time in 13 years, Floyd Jr. announced that Floyd Sr. would return as his trainer against Robert Guerrero. While some speculated this was because of the bloody nose Jr. got in an otherwise dominant performance against Miguel Cotto (a change to the more defensive-oriented 
Floyd Sr. over the offensive Roger was seen as logical), Floyd Jr. cited his uncle Roger's health issues, diabetes, and poor vision as rationale for the change. Sr. has remained the trainer of Jr. ever since and trained him to victory in his fight over Manny Pacquiao.

Personal life
Mayweather Sr. suffers from the lung disease sarcoidosis.

Floyd’s younger brother, Roger was WBC super featherweight and super lightweight champion. The youngest brother, Jeff, held the IBO super featherweight title.

Professional boxing record

References

External links 
Price of love is high when it comes to Mayweather family values by Ron Lewis, The Times, May 5, 2007. Retrieved January 3, 2022.
 
 Jeff Mayweather's Pro Boxing Insider 
 Floyd Mayweather Sr. Talks About Steroids

1952 births
African-American boxers
American boxing trainers
American drug traffickers
American male boxers
American people convicted of drug offenses
Boxers from Michigan
Living people
Sportspeople from the Bronx
Welterweight boxers
Boxers from New York City
21st-century African-American people
20th-century African-American sportspeople